Mędrzyny  is an abandoned village in the administrative district of Gmina Purda, within Olsztyn County, Warmian-Masurian Voivodeship, in northern Poland. It is located on the western shore of Lake Kośno in the region of Warmia.

In 1863, the village had a population of 25, exclusively Polish by nationality and Catholic by confession.

Transport
The National road 53 runs nearby, north of the village.

References

Former populated places in Poland
Villages in Olsztyn County